John Clark (14 May 1907 – 21 November 1984) was an Australian politician who represented the South Australian House of Assembly seats of Gawler and Elizabeth from 1952 to 1970 and from 1970 to 1973 for the Labor Party.

References

 

Members of the South Australian House of Assembly
Australian Labor Party members of the Parliament of South Australia
1907 births
1984 deaths
20th-century Australian politicians